Austrocnemis splendida is a species of damselfly in the family Coenagrionidae,
commonly known as a splendid longlegs.

Austrocnemis splendida is a tiny damselfly, bronze-black in colour with very long legs. Males have a blue patch on each side of their body and a pale blue tail band;
females have red on their body with no tail band. 
It is found in eastern Australia, where it inhabits streams and slow-moving water.
It is commonly found sitting flat on a waterlily or other floating leaf.

Gallery

See also
 List of Odonata species of Australia

References 

Coenagrionidae
Odonata of Australia
Insects of Australia
Endemic fauna of Australia
Taxa named by René Martin
Insects described in 1901
Damselflies